Charles Dymoke Green, senior (28 May 18731954) was an early leader of The Boy Scouts Association, its District Commissioner of Saint Albans from at least 1912 to 1948, and a personal friend of Robert Baden-Powell.

His son, Charles Dymoke Green Jr., was also a leader in boy scouting.

References

External links

1873 births
The Scout Association
1954 deaths
Charles